Clumping factor A, or ClfA, is a virulence factor from Staphylococcus aureus (S. aureus) that binds to fibrinogen.

ClfA also has been shown to bind to complement regulator I protein.

It is responsible for the clumping of blood plasma observed when adding S. aureus to human plasma. Clumping factor can be detected by the slide test.

See also
 Tefibazumab
 Coagulase

References

Staphylococcaceae
Bacterial proteins
Virulence factors